The Federal Institute of Rio Grande do Sul (IFRS), or in full: Federal Institute of Education, Science and Technology of Rio Grande do Sul is an institution that offers high and professional educations by having a pluricurricular form. It is an multicampi institution, especialized in offering professional and technological education in different areas of knowledge (biologics/human sciences/exact sciences).

IFRS is a federal institution, public, directly vinculated to the Ministry of Education of Brazil.

Campuses
Bento Gonçalves, Porto Alegre, Feliz, Porto Alegre-Restinga, Sertão, Canoas, Caxias do Sul, Osório, Erechim, Rio Grande and Novo Hamburgo

See also
Federal University of Rio Grande do Sul

References

Universities and colleges in Rio Grande do Sul
Rio Grande do Sul